Andréia dos Santos known as Maycon  (born April 30, 1977, in Lages, Santa Catarina) is a Brazilian women's association football player. She currently plays as a midfielder for Brazil's Saad EC.  She was a member of the Brazilian National Team that won the silver medal at the 2004 Summer Olympics.  She is known for her speed and dribbling ability.

Her nickname is originated from a similarity with her idol, Michael Jackson.

References 

1977 births
Living people
People from Lages
Brazilian women's footballers
Women's association football midfielders
Footballers at the 2000 Summer Olympics
Footballers at the 2004 Summer Olympics
Footballers at the 2008 Summer Olympics
Olympic footballers of Brazil
Olympic silver medalists for Brazil
Olympic medalists in football
Medalists at the 2008 Summer Olympics
Medalists at the 2004 Summer Olympics
Brazil women's international footballers
Pan American Games gold medalists for Brazil
Pan American Games silver medalists for Brazil
Pan American Games medalists in football
2007 FIFA Women's World Cup players
Footballers at the 2003 Pan American Games
Footballers at the 2007 Pan American Games
Footballers at the 2011 Pan American Games
2003 FIFA Women's World Cup players
1999 FIFA Women's World Cup players
Medalists at the 2003 Pan American Games
Medalists at the 2007 Pan American Games
Medalists at the 2011 Pan American Games
Sportspeople from Santa Catarina (state)